Andrew Robert Davies (born 19 May 1983) is a Welsh former darts player who played in events of the Professional Darts Corporation (PDC). He currently works for the PDC as a scoring official.

Career 
Davies played in the 2003 UK Open, losing in the last 64 stage to Henry O'Neill. Davies then qualified for the 2003 Las Vegas Desert Classic, narrowly losing both group games to Wayne Mardle and Roland Scholten. Davies reached the 64 stage of the 2005 UK Open, winning two matches before losing 8–0 to Mark Holden. Since then though, Davies has not been able to qualify for a major event, his last big event came in the 2007 US Open, reaching the third round before losing to Scholten.

Davies announced his retirement from professional darts in May 2009.

Since 2010 Andrew has returned to the circuit as a scorer, he can be identified by his signature shake of the hand and nod of the head as he greets the competitors.

Personal life 
Davies is a practicing Jehovah's Witness and has spoken publicly about his passion for Christ. He has runs lessons for budding dart officials called "Jesus was a Scorer".

Outside of darts, Davies is a keen golfer (claims of an impressive handicap are unverified) – he is deeply superstitious and will only play on sunny days. He has names for all his clubs (His 9 iron is called Ted Lowe and his putter, Jockey Wilson).

Davies is well known for his charitable work in the local community and has had a bench named after him on Pendine cliff, as well as having his own seat at The Springwell Inn.

Despite being a keen motorist in his youth, he gave up his license in September 2011 after his prized BMW Z3 convertible was written off in a flash flood. He was quoted in his local paper as saying "It was the only car I ever loved, I wont be replacing her"

Andrew lives at home with his long-term partner and has an extensive collection of Thunderbird memorabilia. On the subject of children, Andrew has been quoted as saying "The time just isn't right for us right now, Amy has told me I need to learn to cook something other than waffles, cod and beans before I can bring a child into this world"

External links
Profile and stats on Darts Database

1983 births
Living people
Welsh darts players
Professional Darts Corporation former pro tour players